Doh (also spelled Do) is a village in eastern Ivory Coast. It is in the sub-prefecture of Guintéguéla,  Touba Department, Bafing Region, Woroba District.

Doh was a commune until March 2012, when it became one of 1126 communes nationwide that were abolished.

Notes

Former communes of Ivory Coast
Populated places in Woroba District
Populated places in Bafing Region